Irreligion, atheism and agnosticism are present among Albanians (see religion in Albania), along with the predominant faiths of Islam and Christianity. The majority of Albanians lead a secular life and reject religious considerations to shape or condition their way of life.

Irreligion in Albania arose after a period of rising anti-clericalism and secularization in the context of the rising Albanian nationalism in the late Ottoman Empire. While authors in this period had at times used invective against religion, the first public advocate of abandoning religion itself was Ismet Toto in 1934 followed by works by Anastas Plasari in 1935. Beginning in 1946 under communist rule in Albania, religion was first curtailed, and then public religious practice was outlawed in 1967 with the adoption of state atheism by Enver Hoxha although some private practice survived, and remained so until restrictions were first eased in 1985 and then removed in 1990 under his successor Ramiz Alia. Polling by UNDP showed that large majorities of Albanians agree that nationalism, lack of religion and the ban of religion during communist rule have helped build the foundations of religious tolerance.

Nowadays, estimations of the size of the irreligious population vary widely. The self declared atheist population has been given figures ranging from 2.5% to 8% to 9% while other estimates of irreligiosity have reported figures of 39% declaring as "atheists"(9%) or "nonreligious"(30%), 61% not saying religion was "important" to their lives, and 72% "non-practicing". Many Albanians identified as Muslims or Christians have been found to practice only few or none of their faith's observances. Based on studies conducted in 2008, 2009 and 2015, Albania was found out to be the 20th least religious country in the world, with 39% of the population being religious.

Religious identity in Albania is typically assigned by attribution, usually by familial history, rather than actual practice. Despite widespread lack of religious practice, and while there are numerous public figures who openly declare themselves as atheist, there have also been complaints about negative public discourse toward atheists.

History

In the late Ottoman era, in order to overcome the religious divisions among Albanians between members of the local Sunni Muslim, Orthodox Christian, Bektashi Muslim and Roman Catholic Christian communities. Albanian nationalism, as it emerged, tended to urge Albanians to disregard religious differences, arguing that divisive sectarian religious fanaticism was alien to Albanian culture, and propagated what some historians refer to as a "'civic religion' of Albanianism". Vaso Pasha's famous poem O moj Shqypni told Albanians to "swear an oath not to mind [lit. "look to"] church or mosque" because "the faith of the Albanian is Albanianism" ( or in ).

Albanian national revivalists in the 19th century such as Faik Konitza, Jani Vreto and Zef Jubani were often anti-clerical in rhetoric (Konitza said in 1897: "Every faith religion makes me puke", or ) but the first advocate of atheism in modern Albania is thought to have been Ismet Toto, a publicist and revolutionary whose 1934 anti-religious polemic, Grindje me Klerin ("Quarrel with the clergy
"), was one of the first known works advocating against the practice of religion itself in the Albanian language. This was followed by Sëmundja Fetare ("The Disease of Religion"), another important anti-religious polemic by Anastas Plasari in 1935. The poem Blasfemi by Migjeni, who was considered to be an atheist by many, is also noted as being anti-religious. Another important figure before that time was the politician and mayor of Gjirokastër, Hysen Hoxha, the uncle of Enver Hoxha, who was considered to be a "Radical Atheist and anti-colonialist". His atheistic views influenced those of Enver Hoxha.

It noted his reign, Ahmet Zogu embraced the renaissance ideals of unity, areligiosity and European modernity, and turned them into the very ideology of the state.

During the communist era, Albania transitioned from a simple secular state to, in 1967, an entity upholding state atheism by which all public practice of religion was banned, although some private practice survived. The beginning of anti-religious policies implemented by the Communist Party of Albania was in August 1946, with the Agrarian Reform Law which nationalized most of the property of religious institutions, restricted the activity of religious institutions, and preceded the persecution of many clergy and believers and the expulsion of all foreign Catholic priests.

In 1967 Enver Hoxha took Pashko Vasa's poem literally, turning the struggle against the divisiveness of religious affiliations into a struggle against religion itself in order to replace the divisive allegiances of the different religious communities with a unifying loyalty to the Communist state, and he declared Albania an Atheist State, in which public religious practice was prohibited. By May 1967, all 2,169 religious buildings in Albania were nationalized, with many converted into cultural centers. A major center for anti-religious propaganda was the National Museum of Atheism in Shkodër, the city viewed by the government as the most religiously conservative. After the death of Enver Hoxha in 1985, his successor, Ramiz Alia, adopted a more tolerant stance toward religious practice, calling it as "a personal and family matter." Émigré clergymen were permitted to reenter the country in 1988 and officiate at religious services. Mother Teresa, an ethnic Albanian, visited Tirana in 1989, where she was received by the foreign minister and by Hoxha's widow. In December 1990, the ban on religious observance was officially lifted, in time to allow thousands of Christians to attend Christmas services, although other sources report that official termination of the ban was in 1991.

In 2014, following a visit by Pope Francis to Albania, some intellectuals criticized what they perceived as negative rhetoric aimed at atheists, which increasingly linked atheism to "communist crimes" and spoke of atheism as "deficient", leading to complaints that the revival of an anti-atheist "taboo", among other issues.

Demography

Prevalence of irreligion

Different surveys have produced considerably varying figures for size of the irreligious population of Albania. A simple majority of the population claimed "no religious alliance" in 1993 while the irreligious population was recorded at 74% in 1994 and more than 72% reported in 2005 as per religious practice (the remainder was 21% forms of Islam, 6% Orthodoxy and 3% Catholicism). In August 2012, Pew Research study found out that only 15 percent of the Muslim population for example, consider religion as a very important factor in their lives, which was the lowest percentage in the world amongst countries with significant Muslim populations. Another survey conducted by Gallup Global Reports 2010 shows that religion plays an important role in the lives of 39 percent of Albanians, and lists Albania as the thirteenth least religious country of the 114 surveyed. When asked if they were "religious" in 2016 by Badem-WIN and Gallup-International, 56% of Albanians said they were "religious", 30% said they were "not religious", 9% said "atheist", and 5% did not answer, with the same study finding that 80% of Albanians believe in the concept of "God", 40% believing in life after death, 57% believing in the existence of souls, 40% believing in hell, and 42% believing in heaven. Also in Albania only 36.8% of the males are circumcised, with the rate being 46.5% for those from Muslim background even though for Muslims in general it is an almost universal Islamic custom.

In the 2011 census, preliminary results showed 70% of Albanians refusing to declare belief in any of the listed faiths although the final results may have differed markedly from this in showing the majority of Albanians associated with Islam and Christianity while 16.3% of Albanians either didn't answer or were atheist and another 5.5% were listed as "believers without (specific) faith". The final results were nevertheless criticized by numerous communities as well as international organizations such as the Council of Europe, and news media noted concerns that there were reports where workers filled out the religion question without actually asking the participants, and that they used pencils which wasn't allowed, possibly leading to incorrect tallies; in the religious dimension, both the Orthodox and the Bektashis claimed they were vastly underrepresented.

Regional comparison
A 2018 survey based on three WIN/Gallup International polls and published in the UK Telegraph showed Albania was the least religious county in the Balkans, having a "Western-style" attitude to religion, with only 39% being religious. In contrast with Macedonia (88%), Kosovo (83%) and Romania (77%). In Serbia, Croatia, Greece the figure was from 70% to 72%. In Bosnia the figure was 65% religious, while in Bulgaria it was 52%.

Characteristics of the general population

Younger Albanians have been found to manifest more irreligion than their elders, making the trend in Albania opposite that found in Bosnia and those of Orthodox background have been found to report the lowest importance of "God in their lives", closely followed by those of Muslim background, while those of Catholic background showed greater "importance of God in their lives" (for example, 54.5% of those of Catholic background said that God was "very important in their lives", compared to 26.7% of Orthodox and 35.6% of Muslims).

A 2008 medical study in Tirana on the relationship between religious observance and acute coronary syndrome found out that 67% of Muslims and 55% of Christians were completely religiously non-observant. The regular attendance of religious institutions (at least once every 2 weeks) was low in both denominations (6% in Muslims and 9% in Christians), and weekly attendance was very low (2% and 1%, respectively). Frequent praying (at least 2 to 3 times per week) was higher in Christians (29%) than in Muslims (17%). Praying several times daily (as required of devout Muslims) was rare (2% in Muslims and 3% in Christians). Regular fasting during Ramadan or Lent was similarly low in Muslims and Christians (5% and 6%, respectively). Generally Christians in the study were more observant then Muslims (26% vs 17%).

A 2015 study on the Albanian youth aged 16–27 found that total of 80 percent of young people in Albania are not religion practitioners and practice their religion only during the main religious holidays and festivities. Specifically 23 percent of the respondents never practised their religion, while 61 percent practised it only in religious holidays. From the rest, 11 percent practiced it 1-2 times a week, while 5 percent practiced it every day.

A 2016 study on homophobia among Albanian students found that a decrease in the level of religious belief was correlated with decreased detection of homophobia, while no difference was observed between those who identified with Catholicism or Islam.

A study by the United Nations Development Programme in 2018 showed that 62.7% of Albanians do not practice religion while 37.3% do practice it.

Prevalence of specific beliefs

In the European Values Survey in 2008, Albania had the highest unbelief in the life after death among all other countries, with 74.3% not believing in it.

According to the WIN/Gallup International study in 2016 about the beliefs of the Albanians:

80% believed in a god 
40% believed in Life after death
57% believed that people have a soul 
40% believed in hell
42% believed in heaven

Society

In Albania, religious identity is typically defined by attribution, typically via one's familial religious background, rather than actual adherence, and regardless of an individual's religiosity or lack thereof, it can still be socially significant, as it is occasionally linked to historical socioeconomic and cultural factors in some contexts.

Some antipathy toward overt atheists has been detected in surveys—in one edition of the World Values Survey, 19.7% of Catholics, 17% of Muslims, and 9.4% of Orthodox "strongly agreed" that "those who don't believe in God" are unfit for office (total agreeing: 47.3% of Catholics, 46.9% of Muslims and 37% of Orthodox). According to a 2011 study by Ipsos, 53.5% of the Albanians found atheists "similar" to them while 34.1% found them "different".

Some Albanian intellectuals have complained about the revival of a "taboo" against atheism as seen in the rhetoric surrounding the 2014 visit of the Pope to the country where atheism was linked to "communist crimes" and seen as "deficient", and that the new Albanian constitution claims trust in God as a "universal" value despite the significant number of people who don't believe in God in the country. There have also been complaints about discourse both in Albania and by foreigners which cites statistics of the traditional population shares of the different Muslim and Christian sects present, which would show the country to be a 100% religious country, thus erasing the presence of the irreligious.

Prime Minister Edi Rama (himself of Catholic and Orthodox extraction with a Muslim wife and having expressed doubt about the existence of God) has asserted that Albania's traditional religious harmony, traditionally defined as being between the four main faiths of Sunni Islam, Orthodox Christianity, Bektashi Islam and Roman Catholic Christianity, should also include the irreligious. However, in a 2018 public speech he has used the word pafe  (infidel) as a slur against his political opponents.

See also
 Religion in Albania
 Secularism in Albania

Religions
 Christianity in Albania
 Roman Catholicism in Albania
 Orthodoxy in Albania
 Islam in Albania
 Protestantism in Albania
 Judaism in Albania

References

 
Religion in Albania
Albania